The World Political Forum (also called Istanbul Forum) is a non-profit foundation, based in Turkey, best known for its annual meeting in Istanbul. The forum takes place with the participation of statesmen, CEOs, opinion leaders, bureaucrats and the business elite as well as renowned figures from reputable universities.

History

Ahmet Eyüp Özgüç is the current President of the Foundation which originally started the preparations for the summit in 2010 and sought to broaden its vision further to include providing a platform for resolving international conflicts.

The first was held on 13–14 March 2011, in Istanbul and was hosted by the Turkish Foundation and supported by the Turkish Prime Ministry. The theme was “Changing to meet, meeting to change”, emphasizing the radical changes in policymakers’ thinking now taking place and the importance of sharing new ideas to address the urgent problems facing particularly the Middle East.
The summit was the first of what Turkish Foundation President Ahmet Eyüp Özgüç planned to be an annual forum supported by the Turkish Foundation. Just as the G8 is losing out to a more representative G20 in global economic decision-making, the Turkish organizers intend that such summits provide a more democratic platform for voices of change.

The second World Political Forum was held on May 17–18, 2012, with the theme of "Building a New World".

Third summit is to be held in June 2013 with the theme "A New and Righteous World Order".

Participants
The two-day event called the “Leaders of Change Summit” opened March 13, 2011. It consisted of nearly 100 speakers:

Vedat Akgiray, Chairman of the Capital Markets Board of Turkey
Sayyed Ammar Alhakim, President of Islamic Supreme Council of Iraq
Tariq al-Hashimi, Vice President of Iraq
Abdulkadir Aksu, Vice President of Justice and Development Party
Metropolit Alexander, Russian Orthodox Church, the Metropolit of Astana and Kyrgyzstan
Kofi Annan, 7th Secretary-General of the United Nations
Ömer Aras, Finansbank Group CEO
Prof. Deniz Ülke Arıboğan, Istanbul Bilgi University member of board of trustees
Bülent Arınç, State Minister and Deputy Prime Minister of Turkey
Mykola Azarov, Prime Minister of Ukraine
Sheik Dr. Muhammad Sabah Al-Salem Al-Sabah, Kuwait Deputiy Of Prime Minister and Minister of Foreign Affairs
Ali Babacan, Minister of State and Deputy Prime Minister of Republic of Turkey
Abdullah Ahmad Badawi, 5th Prime Minister of Malaysia
Egemen Bağış, Minister of EU Affairs and Chief Negotiator of the Republic of Turkey
Zvi Bar'el, Author-Journalist
Prof. Ali Bardakoğlu, Former President of Religious Affairs of Republic of Turkey
Bartholomew I, Patriarch of the Fener Greek Orthodox Patriarchate in Istanbul
Deniz Bayramoğlu, Journalist / Writer
Tevfik Bilgin, Chairman of BRSA (Banking Regulation and Supervision Agency)
Prof. Nick Bostrom, Oxford University Director of Future of Humanity Institute
Pier Luigi Celata, Secretary General of the Council of Inter-religions in Vatican
Ahmed Najib Chebbi, Tunisia Minister of Development, President of Democratic Party
Helen Clark, Administrator of UNDP
Prof. Paul Collier, Professor of Economics at the University of Oxford Economics Department
Wendy Chamberlin, President of Washington Middle East Institute
Eric Cornut, Head Novartis Pharma Region Europe
Cengiz Çandar, Coloumnist in Radikal Newspaper
Mevlüt Çavuşoğlu, President of the Parliamentary Assembly of the Council of Europe
Gökhan Çetinsaya, President of Istanbul Şehir University
Ahmet Davutoğlu, Minister of Foreign Affairs
Kemal Derviş, Director of the Global Economy and Development Program at the Brooking Institution
Ekrem Dumanlı, Zaman Newspaper Executive Editor
Prof. William Eimicke, Founding Director of School of International and Public Affairs, Columbia University
Şükrü Elekdağ, Ambassador, Member of the Parliament
Prof. John Ellis, Cern
Ekrem Erdem, AKP (Justice and Development Party) Deputy Chairman
Zeynel Abidin Erdem, Erdem Holding Chairman of the Board of Directors
Recep Tayyip Erdogan, Prime Minister of the Republic of Turkey
Hüseyin Erkan, Chairman of Istanbul Stock Exchange
Vincente Fox, 35th President of Mexico and Member of the Club of Madrid
Aart de Geus, Deputy-Secretary-General of OECD
Prof. Jay Goodman, Professor of Political Science at Wheaton College
Al Gore, 45th Vice President of the United States of America
Zeynep Göğüş, Journalist - Writer
Prof. Mehmet Görmez, President of Religious Affairs of Republic of Turkey
Isak Haleva, Chief Rabbi of Turkish Jewish Community
Oğuz Haksever, Journalist
Bakir Izetbegović, President of Bosnia Herzegovina
Lionel Jospin, 165th Prime Minister of France and Member of the Club of Madrid
Ibrahim Kalin, Senior Advisor to the Prime Minister of Republic of Turkey
Stephen Kinzer, Journalist and Author
Metin Kilci, Undersecuretary of Republic of Turkey Ministry of Energy and Natural Resources
Wim Kok, Former Prime Minister of Netherlands and Member of the Club of Madrid
Temel Kotil, Turkish Airlines CEO
Ludger Kühnhardt, Director of the Center for European Integration Studies
Mehdi Mabrouk, Tunisian Minister of Culture
Prof. Ali Mazrui, Professor at The State University of New York at Binghamton
Murat Mercan, President of Turkish Parliamentary Foreign Relations Commission
Hossein Nasr, Professor of Islamic studies at the George Washington University
Ahmet Eyüp Özgüç, Board of Directors of TÜGAV
Ömer Özkaya, Editor in chef of East West Researches Institute
Hegumen Philip, Russian Orthodox Church Hegumen
Prof. Tariq Ramadan, Professor of Contemporary Islamic Studies at the University of Oxford
Rahip Gregory Roschin, Russian Orthodox Church
Prof. Mehdi Roustami, Iran Oil University Faculty Member
Lucian Sarb, Euronews Director of News and Programmes
Ali Saydam, Bersay CEO
Rabbi Arthur Schneier, President and Founder of the Appeal of Conscience Foundation
Yavuz Semerci, Journalist and Writer
Prof. Yunus Söylet, President of Istanbul University
Lord Nicholas Stern, Professor at London School of Economics
Ümit Sezgin, Editorial Director of TRT TURK
Ferit Faik Şahenk, Chairman of Doğuş Holding
Idris Naim Şahin, Member of Turkish Parliament
Özay Şendir, Journalist and Writer
Sani Şener, TAV CEO
Mehmet Şimşek, Republic of Turkey Finance Minister
John Sitilides, Principal, Trilogy Advisors LLC, Washington, D.C.
Hashim Thaçi, Prime Minister of Kosovo
Prof. Vito Tanzi, Economist and Writer
Gönül Tol, Director for The Center Turkish studies at the Washington Middle East Institute
Kadir Topbaş, Mayor of Istanbul Metropolitan Municipality
Hadi Ulengin, Journalist Writer
Levent Veziroğlu, Executive Vice President, Doguş Group Office of the Chairman
Rüdiger Voss, CERN Senior Physicist
Eric Walberg, Journalist
Ross Wilson, Atlantic Council Dinu Patriciu Director of Eurasia
Hayati Yazıcı, Minister of State and Deputy Prime Minister of the Republic of Turkey
Binali Yıldırım, Republic of Turkey Minister of Transport and Communications
Taner Yıldız, Republic of Turkey Minister of Energy and Natural Resources
Durmuş Yılmaz, Governor of the Central Bank of the Republic of Turkey
Ulrich Zachau, Country Director for Turkey Europe and Central Asia Region of the World Bank

See also
anti-globalization movement
globalization
world economy
World Economic Forum
Horasis The Global Visions Community
World Knowledge Forum
World Social Forum
Public Eye Awards

References

External links
 , World Political Forum's official website

21st-century economic history
Organizations based in Istanbul
Foundations based in Turkey
Global policy organizations
Organizations established in 2011
2011 establishments in Turkey